Sanjati is the third studio album by the Sarajevo-based Bosnian pop rock band Crvena jabuka. It was released in March 1988. In the ex-Yugoslavian territory it sold over 250,000 copies.

Background
Following the mediocre performance of their previous release, Crevena Jabuka took a year off as a year of silence for the two late members they lost in the last quarter of 1986. During this time, many fans wondered if the band would ever reform, or if it was just a one-off band that would be remembered for the first two albums they released.

In early 1988, Zlatko Arslanagić, elected to reform the rest of the band. After a lengthy search, it was decided that Dražen Žerić, who provided backing vocals on the debut album, should take the role as lead singer (Žerić sang lead vocals on all 12 tracks of the previous album, which was recorded in haste).

This would not be the only change to happen to the band. Crvena Jabuka decided to move to a studio in Makrska where they still record today. They also appointed Travnik-born Niksa Bratos who was guitarist in Valentino, another ex-Yugoslavian band. Bratos was a multi-instrumentalist although he only handled production duties on this record and did not achieve full-time membership status until the next album.

When Sanjati was released, over the next few weeks it quickly went as far as to sell about 250,000 copies resulting in a gold diamond. Because of the extreme commercial success, the band embarked on a tour over the summer and fall, their first ever. The tour had them playing in venues across most of Yugoslavia. Because there was not adequate manpower, the band appointed Srdjan Serbedjija on bass (he played on most of the record) and keyboardist Zlatko Volarevic-Dilajla, thus bringing the group back up to a quintet.

Sanjati brought back a lot of the sound from their debut album. The group earned a string of hits and also some minor hits. Critics even constantly praised the band for the excellent and refined sound.

Track listing
All tracks were written by Zlatko Arslanagić.

"Zovu nas ulice"
""
"Ti znaš"
""
""
""
"Ima nešto od srca do srca"
""
""
""
""
"Sanjati"

Personnel
Dražen Žerić - main vocals
Zlatko Arslanagić - guitar
Darko Jelčić - drums, percussion
Branko Salka - bass guitar
Zlatko Voralević - keyboards, other programming

References

1988 albums
Crvena jabuka albums